Until There's Nothing Left of Us is Kill Hannah's fifth full-length studio album and their second album on major label, Atlantic Records. The first single from the album was "Lips Like Morphine", released before the album came out. The video is shot in black and white and set in an 'industrial wasteland'. The second single was "Crazy Angel" as announced on July 26, 2006 at the Fan Appreciation Show.

Track listing

Standard version
All songs written by Mat Devine, except where noted

International version

Personnel

Band
Mat Devine – vocals, guitar
Jonathan Radtke – guitar, backing vocals  
Dan Wiese – guitar, backing vocals
Greg Corner – bass

Additional musicians
Garret Hammond – drums
Matt Skaggs – synthesizers
Juliette Beavan – vocals
Sean Beavan – vocals

Production
Johnny K – production, engineering, mixing
Sean Beavan – producer, engineer, mixing
Chris Lord-Alge – mixing
Tom Baker – mastering
Ted Jensen – mastering

Design
Eric Altenburger – photo composites
Joseph Cultice – photography, cover art concept
Alex Kirzhner – art direction, Design
Cerise Leang – model
Andrew Zaeh – art producer

Chart performance

Kill Hannah albums
2006 albums
Atlantic Records albums